is a Japanese former racing cyclist, who currently works as a directeur sportif for UCI Continental team .
His younger brother Fumiyuki Beppu is also former professional cyclist.

Major results

2002
 9th Tour de Okinawa
2004
 1st Stage 2 Tour of Japan
 6th Tour de Okinawa
2005
 6th Tour de Okinawa
 8th Overall Tour of Japan
 10th Tour du Lac Léman
2006
 1st Challenge Cycle Road Race
 4th Overall Tour of Hong Kong Shanghai
 5th Tour de Okinawa
 6th Overall Tour of South China Sea
 10th Overall Tour of Japan
2007
 5th Overall Tour de East Java
2009
 7th Overall Tour de East Java
2010
 2nd Overall Jelajah Malaysia
 9th Kumamoto International Road Race

References

External links
  
 

Japanese male cyclists
1979 births
Living people
People from Chigasaki, Kanagawa